Levidi is a small town and a former municipality in Arcadia, Peloponnese, Greece. Since the 2011 local government reform it is part of the municipality Tripoli, of which it is a municipal unit. The municipal unit has an area of 312.641 km2. The town is situated on the northeastern slope of the Mainalo mountains, at about 850 m elevation. Levidi is 9 km northwest of Kapsas, 10 km east of Vytina, 12 km southwest of Kandila and 20 km northwest of Tripoli. It is at the junction of the Greek National Road 74 (Tripoli–Pyrgos) and the Greek National Road 66 (Levidi - Nemea).

Levidi was the site of several battles during the Greek War of Independence from the Ottoman Empire, and in ancient times was thought to have been the site of a sanctuary to Artemis Hymnia.

The great Greek-Australian rugby league footballer George Peponis has ancestral ties to this town.

Subdivisions
The municipal unit Levidi is subdivided into the following communities (constituent villages in brackets):
Chotoussa 
Daras 
Kandila (Kandila, Diakopi, Moni Kandilas)
Kardaras
Komi 
Levidi 
Limni 
Orchomenos (Orchomenos, Roussis)
Palaiopyrgos 
Panagitsa 
Vlacherna

Historical population

Environment

From the town’s center The square overlooks Mainalo, Ascension Hill, Mount Artemisio and Helmos. and the huge plain (Οropedio) below. At the other end of the plain below there are abruptly rising mountain ranges. The plain is a closed geological basin of karstic origin. The Mainalo’s slopes are forested. But the landscape of the plain below is grassy and rural. Hills and mountains frame the plain on all sides, they are covered by rock debris (in geology) and shrubs.

See also
 List of settlements in Arcadia
 Ponor
 Karst spring
 Plateau

References

External links
 Arcadia - Levidi, page University of Patraa 
 Hellenic Statistical Authority   aaaaaaaa.xls   
 National Statistical Service of Greece, Population & housing census 2001 (incl. area and average elevation) 

Populated places in Arcadia, Peloponnese